Krasnaya Griva is a rural locality (a village) in Klyazminskoye Rural Settlement, Kovrovsky District, Vladimir Oblast, Russia. The population was 20 as of 2010.

Geography 
Krasnaya Griva is located 30 km northeast of Kovrov (the district's administrative centre) by road. Fedyunino is the nearest rural locality.

References 

Rural localities in Kovrovsky District